The 2004–05 Auburn Tigers men's basketball team represented Auburn University in the 2004–05 college basketball season. The team's head coach was Jeff Lebo, who was in his first season at Auburn. The team played their home games at Beard–Eaves–Memorial Coliseum in Auburn, Alabama. They finished the season 14–17, 4–12 in SEC play. They defeated Vanderbilt to advance to the quarterfinals of the SEC tournament where they lost to LSU.

References

Auburn Tigers men's basketball seasons
Auburn
Auburn
Auburn